Three Birch Trees on the Heath (German: Drei Birken auf der Heide) is a 1956 West German drama film directed by Ulrich Erfurth and starring Margit Saad, Sonja Sutter and Helmuth Schneider. It was one of 54 heimatfilm produced that year, as the genre's popularity reached its peak.

The film's sets were designed by the art director Dieter Bartels. The film was shot at the Wandsbek Studios in Hamburg and on location around Lüneburg Heath outside the city.

Plot

Cast
 Margit Saad as Susanna, Zigeunerin 
 Sonja Sutter as Rose Heidkämper 
 Helmuth Schneider as Hans Freese, Revierförster 
 Albert Matterstock as Jan Wedekind, Verleger 
 Rolf Wanka as Ernö, Zigeunerprimas 
 Irene von Meyendorff as Ada Wedekind 
 Paul Henckels as Vater Heidkämper, Imker 
 Albert Florath as Pastor Mettelmann 
 Carsta Löck as Meta, Haushälterin bei Wedekind 
 Robert Meyn as Rackebrand, Forstmeister 
 Hubert Hilten as Mirko, junger Zigeuner 
 Bum Krüger as Kriminalassistent Grimm 
 Balduin Baas as Plaskude
 Jochen Meyn as Sterthus, Hilfsförster
 Hans Schwarz Jr. as  Oldehoff, Torfbauer
 Lore Schulz as  Trina, Dorfmädchen
 Hans Fitze as  Ahrens, Gemeindevorsteher
 Werner Schumacher as Born, Wachtmeister
 Peter Ahrweiler as  Ein Beamter
 Kerstin De Ahna as Dörte, Dorfmädchen
 Maria Litto as Jolan, Zigeunerin
 Alma Auler as Telefonistin
 Ronni Fischer as Geza, ein junger Zigeuner
 Erica Schramm as Krankenschwester
 Mita von Ahlefeldt as Frau Mettelmann
 August Weiß as Istvan, Stammesältester der Zigeuner

References

Bibliography 
 Elizabeth Boa & Rachel Palfreyman. Heimat - A German Dream: Regional Loyalties and National Identity in German Culture 1890-1990. OUP Oxford, 21 Sep 2000.

External links 
 

1956 films
1956 romantic drama films
German romantic drama films
West German films
1950s German-language films
Films directed by Ulrich Erfurth
Films about Romani people
Films shot at Wandsbek Studios
Real Film films
1950s German films